Pascal Boucherit (born 7 August 1959) is a French sprint canoer who competed from the mid-1980s to the early 1990s. Competing in three Summer Olympics, he won a bronze medal in the K-4 1000 m event at Los Angeles in 1984.

Boucherit also won four medals at the ICF Canoe Sprint World Championships with three golds (K-2 1000 m: 1985, K-2 10000 m: 1987, 1991) and a silver (K-2 1000 m: 1987).

References

External links

1959 births
Canoeists at the 1984 Summer Olympics
Canoeists at the 1988 Summer Olympics
Canoeists at the 1992 Summer Olympics
French male canoeists
Living people
Olympic canoeists of France
Olympic bronze medalists for France
Olympic medalists in canoeing
ICF Canoe Sprint World Championships medalists in kayak
Medalists at the 1984 Summer Olympics
20th-century French people
21st-century French people